Joseph C. Blaha (August 15, 1877–April 1, 1944) was an American businessman and politician.

Blaha was born in Chicago, Illinois. He went to the Chicago parochial schools and to St. Ignatius College Prep School. Blaha was involved in the real estate and insurance business. He was also a merchant. Blaha served in the Illinois House of Representatives from 1911 through 1913 and was a Republican. He also served on the Chicago City Council from the 34th Ward, from 1915 through 1917. Blaha died in Chicago, Illinois.

Notes

External links

1877 births
1944 deaths
Businesspeople from Chicago
Chicago City Council members
Republican Party members of the Illinois House of Representatives
St. Ignatius College Prep alumni